Current Nobody is a full-length play by Melissa James Gibson that premiered at the Woolly Mammoth Theatre in Washington, DC, on October 29, 2007. 

The work offers a play on gender roles against the backdrop of the Trojan War, as stay-at-home father Od struggles to raise his children while his wife Pen covers the military conflict as a journalist. 

The Washington Post described the play as "wise" and "heartsome."

References

2007 plays
Canadian plays
Modern adaptations of the Odyssey
Plays based on classical mythology
Plays based on works by Homer
Trojan War literature